Simon, bastard son of Roger II of Sicily, was declared Prince of Taranto by his father in 1148, on the death of Roger III, Duke of Apulia, the eldest legitimate son of Roger II.

In 1154, Roger II died and the kingdom of Sicily passed to his fourth son, William I. William dispossessed his half-brother Simon immediately, claiming that Taranto was too important a fief to go to an illegitimate son. Simon held a grudge against the king and was called upon by Matthew Bonnellus to lead the revolt in the capital city of Palermo in 1161. This Simon did, with his nephew, Tancred of Lecce, the bastard son of Roger of Apulia, on 9 March. Simon and Tancred invaded the palace, detained King William, Queen Margaret, and their two sons, and incited a massacre of Muslims. Originally, the older of the king's sons, Roger IV, Duke of Apulia, was destined to be crowned in place of William, but soon the populace supported the accession of Simon himself. Before Simon could put himself forward as a candidate, however, the rebellion had broken down and the people were restless. The insurrectionists were forced to free the king and retreat to their castles. Pardon was given them on condition of exile and many, including Simon, took the offer.

Simon did not try to seize the crown on William's death in 1166, as had been feared. Instead, the new king's uncle, Henry, Count of Montescaglioso, laid claim to Taranto and all of Simon's former territories.

References
Norwich, John Julius. The Kingdom in the Sun 1130–1194. Longmans: London, 1970.

Italo-Normans
Princes of Taranto
Hauteville family
Sons of kings
Children of Roger II of Sicily